Cyperus dioicus is a species of sedge that is native to north western Mexico.

See also 
 List of Cyperus species

References 

dioicus
Plants described in 1924
Flora of Mexico
Taxa named by Ivan Murray Johnston